CUGBP Elav-like family member 6 is a protein that in humans is encoded by the CELF6 gene.

Function

Members of the CELF/BRUNOL protein family contain two N-terminal RNA recognition motif (RRM) domains, one C-terminal RRM domain, and a divergent segment of 160-230 aa between the second and third RRM domains. Members of this protein family regulate pre-mRNA alternative splicing and may also be involved in mRNA editing, and translation. Multiple alternatively spliced transcript variants encoding different isoforms have been identified in this gene. [provided by RefSeq, Feb 2010].

References

Further reading